Pretty & Twisted is the debut album by the American alternative rock band Pretty & Twisted, released in 1995. It was the band's only album. 

Pretty & Twisted is dedicated to Marlon Brando. The album's first single was "¡Ride!", which was written with Chris Bailey. The band supported the album by touring with the Young Dubliners. "The Highs Are Too High" was featured in "Nobody Knows Anything" in Season 1 of The Sopranos.

Production
The album was produced by Johnette Napolitano; it began as a solo project, with Napolitano initially recording in her home. "Mother of Pearl" is a cover of the Roxy Music song. "Come Away with Me" incorporates unrecorded lyrics written by Janis Joplin. "Singing Is Fire" is a Charles Bukowski poem set to music; "Stranger" was written with Paul Westerberg.

Critical reception

Trouser Press wrote that "while Pretty & Twisted simplifies things and cuts away the artsier pretensions of latter-day Concrete Blonde, it replaces them with dopier ego indulgences." The Los Angeles Times thought that "there's something both Bowie-esque and Cure-like in the band's aggressively ominous atmospherics—a sound with the grit and the grace to make the edge of desperation seem like the only place to be." The Hamilton Spectator declared that "Napolitano's experience certainly gives Pretty & Twisted a decided advantage as one of the better debut albums to come around in a while."

The Knoxville News Sentinel determined that "for all the intrigue of the lyrics and singing, Pretty & Twisted only sporadically gets substantial instrumental support." The Calgary Herald concluded that "many of these songs lay lifelessly in the cauldron, although the ones that do work roar out spitting and smoking." The Indianapolis Star opined that "much of this new disc runs flat, with dark tracks bearing well-worn sentiments."

AllMusic called the album "a wonderful slice of adult alternative rock that is both melodic and intelligent."

Track listing

Personnel
Credits are adapted from the Pretty & Twisted CD album booklet.

 Johnette Napolitano – vocals (1–13), bass (1–13), keyboards (1, 5–7, 11, 13), guitars (1, 3, 9–10), beat (1, 9–10, 13), percussion (2–3, 5–6, 8–11, 13)
 Marc Moreland – guitars (1–13), vocals (4, 11), keyboards (8)
 Danny Montgomery – drums (2–8, 11–12)
 Chris Bailey – guitars (5)

Production
 Johnette Napolitano – producer, engineer
 Earle Mankey – engineer (1–13), mixing (1–12)
 Alex Gordon – engineer (1–13), mixing (13)
 Sean Freehill – engineer, sampling, sequencing
 Anne Catalano – assistant engineer
 Danny, Jeff and Susan at Paramount – additional assistants
 Tom Baker – mastering

Other
 Bruce Poulsen – cover photography
 Johnette Napolitano, Marc Moreland – additional photos
 William Herron III – logo
 Brigid Pearson – assemblage

References

1995 debut albums
Warner Records albums